The Chariton Community School District is a rural public school district headquartered in Chariton, Iowa, USA. The district is mostly within Lucas County; a small portion is in Marion County. Its service area includes Chariton, Lucas, Russell, and Williamson.

History

After the 2008 dissolution of the Russell Community School District, the district absorbed some of the former students of the Russell district.

Schools 
The district operates four schools, all in Chariton:
Elementary schools
Columbus Elementary School
Van Allen Elementary School
Middle schools
Chariton Middle School
High schools
Chariton High School

See also
List of school districts in Iowa

References

External links 
Chariton Community School District

Education in Lucas County, Iowa
Education in Marion County, Iowa
School districts in Iowa
Chariton, Iowa